"(I'd) Wait a Million Years" (also known as "Wait a Million Years", "Million Years or So", or simply "Million Years") is a 1969 hit single by The Grass Roots.

Background
It was the first of three single releases from the group's fifth LP, Leaving It All Behind, and is among the group's five greatest hits. It was written by Gary Zekley and Mitchell Bottler. The album version of the song contains a slow organ intro and a longer fadeout, increasing the track's length by almost a minute.

Chart performance
The song reached number 15 on the U.S. Billboard Hot 100 and number 12 on the Cash Box Top 100. In Canada, "I'd Wait a Million Years" spent three weeks at number 12.

Weekly charts

Year-end charts

Personnel
Arranged By [Horns] – Jimmie Haskell

References

External links
 

1969 singles
The Grass Roots songs
1969 songs
ABC Records singles
Songs written by Gary Zekley